Lepidogryllus is a genus of crickets, sometimes known as mottled field crickets, in the family Gryllidae and tribe Modicogryllini.  Species have been found in Australia and Vietnam.

Species 
Lepidogryllus includes the following (mostly Australian) species:
Lepidogryllus badikovi Gorochov, 1992 - Vietnam
Lepidogryllus comparatus Walker, 1869
Lepidogryllus darthvaderi Desutter-Grandcolas & Anso, 2016
Lepidogryllus kimberleyanus (Baehr, 1989)
Lepidogryllus parvulus (Walker, 1869) - type species (as Gryllus parvulus Walker)

References

External links
 
 Images on GBIF: Lepidogryllus Otte & Alexander, 1983

Ensifera genera
Gryllinae
Orthoptera of Asia